Judeo-Urdu is a dialect of the Hindustani language which was spoken by the Baghdadi Jews in India, living in the areas of Bombay and Calcutta towards the end of the 18th century. It is a dialect which was written in the Hebrew script, and found to be utilised for a number of pieces of literature, such as Inder Sabha, a copy of which is kept at the British Library.

Orthography 
The Judeo-Urdu dialect was written in the Hebrew script. The orthography is one of the primary reasons for this dialect being associated with Urdu, rather than Hindi or Hindustani, as the spelling of lemmas found in literature written in the Judeo-Urdu dialect seem to correlate with the Perso-Arab spelling. For instance, Arabic loanwords which contain the letters ط would be mapped to the Hebrew equivalent ט, a pattern which is consistent with other loanwords and loan-letters.

However, when it comes to the representation of sounds found in Indo-Aryan languages, such as Retroflex consonants, were not represented by unique or modified Hebrew letters. Rather, non-Retroflex consonants were also used to represent these sounds, as well as aspirated consonants. This could create ambiguity as some letters, like Dalet, could denote up to four different variations of sounds, while an unvocalised Gimel, could denote potentially up to 5 different sounds.

See also 

 Judeo-Marathi
 Judeo-Malayalam
 Judeo-Persian

References 

Dialects of Urdu
Hindustani language
Urdu in India
Languages of India